Davos (or ; ; archaic ) is an Alpine resort town and a municipality in the Prättigau/Davos Region in the canton of Graubünden, Switzerland. Davos is located on the river Landwasser, in the Rhaetian Alps, between the Plessur and Albula Ranges.

Gaining prominence in the 19th century as a mountain health resort, Davos is perhaps best known today for hosting the World Economic Forum—often referred to simply as "Davos"—an annual meeting of global political and corporate leaders. With a long history of winter sport, Davos also has one of Switzerland's largest ski resorts, and hosts the international Spengler Cup ice hockey tournament each December.

Name
Tavau is the Romansh name, and derives from Latin tubus, here used in the sense of ravine.

History

The current settlement of the Davos area began in the High Middle Ages with the immigration of Rhaeto-Romans. The village of Davos is first mentioned in 1213 as Tavaus. From about 1280 the barons of Vaz allowed German-speaking Walser colonists to settle and conceded them extensive self-administration rights. In 1289 an agreement between the people of Davos and the baron of Vaz included that the Davoser citizens would not have to pay personal taxes, only the Government of Davos had to pay a yearly amount of goods to the baron of Vaz. became the largest Walser settlement area in eastern Switzerland. Natives still speak a dialect that is atypical for Graubünden, showing similarities with the German spoken in Raron in Canton Valais.

In 1436, the League of the Ten Jurisdictions was founded in Davos.

From the middle of the 19th century, Davos modeled on Görbersdorf (now Sokołowsko), became a popular destination for the sick and ailing because the microclimate in the high valley was deemed excellent by doctors (initiated by Alexander Spengler) and recommended for lung disease patients. Robert Louis Stevenson, who suffered from tuberculosis, wintered in Davos in 1880 on the recommendation of his Edinburgh physician Dr. George Balfour. Arthur Conan Doyle wrote an article about skiing in Davos in 1899. A sanatorium in Davos is also the inspiration for the Berghof Sanitorium in Thomas Mann's novel Der Zauberberg (The Magic Mountain). Between 1936 and 1938, Ernst Ludwig Kirchner, then at the end of his life and living in Davos since 1917, depicted Davos and the Junkerboden. His painting has a both Romantic and pantheistic atmosphere and simplified formal structure.

During the natural ice era of winter sports, Davos and the Davos Eisstadion were a mecca for speed skating. Many international championships were held here, and many world records were set, beginning with Peder Østlund who set four records in 1898. The only European Bandy Championship was held in the town in 1913. Subsequently, Davos became a ski resort, especially frequented by tourists from the United Kingdom and the Netherlands. After peaking in the 1970s and 1980s, the city settled down as a leading but less high-profile tourist attraction. The American Van Leer family immigrated from here with their former Valär surname. Today Valärs still live and are members of government.

Geography

Topography

Lake Davos is northeast of the village, formerly the source of the Landwasser.

Of this area, about 35.0% is used for agricultural purposes, while 22.2% is forested. Of the rest of the land, 2.3% is settled (buildings or roads) and 40.5% is unproductive land. Of the agricultural land,  is fields and grasslands and  consists of alpine grazing areas. Rivers and lakes cover  in the municipality.

The Wolfgang Pass divides the waters flowing into the Landquart from the valley of the Landwasser, and has a year-round road and Rhaetian Railway connection. Crossing the pass leads to the village of Klosters and the Prättigau. Three long side valleys reach out to the south from the main valley of the Landwasser, one of which leads to the Flüela Pass and the Engadin beyond.

Political divisions 
The municipality of Davos is divided completely into six Fraktionsgemeinden: Davos Dorf, Davos Platz, Davos Frauenkirch, Davos Glaris, Davos Monstein, and Davos Wiesen. The names of the Fraktionsgemeinden correspond to their largest village within.

Smaller populated places in the municipality are: the village of Davos Clavadel, the hamlets of Laret, Wolfgang, Obem See, Meierhof, Stilli, Bünda, and Spina (in the main Landwasser valley), and Tschuggen, Dörfji, In den Büelen, Hof, Teufi, Gadmen, Am Rin, Dürrboden, Sertig Dörfli, Oberalp, Inneralp (in the side valleys).

Until 2017 the municipality was located in the Davos subdistrict of the Prättigau/Davos district; after 2017 it is part of the Prättigau/Davos Region. In terms of area, it was the largest municipality in Switzerland in 2009 after a municipal merger with Wiesen. Davos lost this distinction after the formation of Glarus Süd in 2010, and today is the 4th largest in the canton of Graubünden.

Climate
Davos has a subalpine climate (Köppen Dfc) with an average of 125.3 days of precipitation per year and on average receives  of precipitation.

During this month there is precipitation for an average of 13.6 days. The month with the most days of precipitation is July, with an average of 13.8, but with only  of precipitation.

Politics

Government
The Small Country Council (Kleiner Landrat) constitutes the executive government of the municipality of Davos and operates as a collegiate authority. It is composed of five councilors, each presiding over a department (Departement) comprising several bureaus. The president of the executive department acts as president of the municipality (Landammann or Gemeindepräsident). In the mandate period 2021–2024 (Legislatur) the Small Country Council is presided by Landammann Philipp Wilhelm. Departmental tasks, coordination measures and implementation of laws decreed by the Grand Country Council are carried by the Small Country Council. The regular election of the municipal councils by any inhabitant valid to vote is held every four years. Any resident of the municipality of Davos allowed to vote and being registered can be elected as a member of the Small Country Council for a maximal period of twelve years. The delegates are selected by means of a system of Majorz. The President is elected as such as well by a public election while the heads of the other departments are assigned by the collegiate. They usually meet once a week.

, Davos's Small Country Council is made up of two members of SP (Social Democratic Party), of whom one is the president), two FDP (FDP.The Liberals), and one Independent. The last regular elections (Landschaftswahlen) were held on 27 September and 29 November 2020.

Parliament

The Grand Country Council (Grosser Landrat) holds legislative power. It is made up of 17 members, with elections held every four years. The Grand Country Council decrees regulations and by-laws that are executed by the Small Country Council and the administration. The delegates are selected by means of a system of Majorz.

The sessions of the Grand Country Council are public. They usually meet ten times a year. Members of the Grand Country Council are not politicians by profession, and they are paid a fee based on their attendance. Any resident of Davos allowed to vote can be elected as a member of the Grand Country Council for a maximal period of twelve years.

The last regular election of the Grand Country Council was held on 27 September 2020 for the mandate period from January 2021 to December 2024. Currently the Grand Country Council consist of 6 (-1) Liberals (FDP/PLR), 3 (-1) Swiss People's Party (SVP/UDC), 3 (+2) members of Social Democratic Party (SP/PS), 2 (+2) members of the Green Liberal Party (glp/pvl), and one each of the Center Party, Evangelical People's Party (EVP/PES), and one independent.

Federal elections

National Council
In the 2019 federal election the most popular party was the SP with 21.3% of the votes. The next five parties were the SVP  (20.0%), FDP (10.1%), CVP (6.8%), and the glp (6.8%). In the federal election, a total of 2'885 votes were cast, and the voter turnout was 41.8%.

In the 2015 federal election the most popular party was the SVP with 30.0% of the votes. The next five parties were the FDP (20.4%), the BDP (15.8%), the SP (14.7%), the glp (12.1%), and CVP (5.2%). In the federal election, a total of 3,231 votes were cast, and the voter turnout was 46.7%.

International relations

Sister and twin towns
None. Former relations have been cancelled since February 2010 by the council due to thorough austerity measures.

Demographics

Population
, 27.0% of the population are resident foreign nationals. In 2015 7.3% of the population was born in Germany and 6.9% of the population was born in Portugal. Over the last four years (2010-2014) the population has changed at a rate of -0.27%. The birth rate in the municipality, in 2014, was 9.1, while the death rate was 8.2 per thousand residents.

Most of the population speaks German (86.3%), with Serbo-Croatian being second most common (2.8%) and Italian being third (2.7%).

, children and teenagers (0–19 years old) make up 17.3% of the population, while adults (20–64 years old) are 64.5% and seniors (over 64 years old) make up 18.2%. In 2015 there were 5,099 single residents, 4,666 people who were married or in a civil partnership, 550 widows or widowers and 794 divorced residents.

In 2014 there were 5,441 private households in Davos with an average household size of 2.03 persons. Of the 2,133 inhabited buildings in the municipality, in 2000, about 30.7% were single family homes and 39.1% were multiple family buildings. Additionally, about 25.9% of the buildings were built before 1919, while 8.3% were built between 1991 and 2000. In 2013 the rate of construction of new housing units per 1000 residents was 23.46. The vacancy rate for the municipality, was 0.71%.

Historic population
The historic population is given in the following chart:

Education
In Davos about 74% of the population (ages 25–64) have completed either nonmandatory upper secondary education or additional higher education (either a university or a Fachhochschule).

Economy
Davos is a tourist community and a regional center.

, there were a total of 8,853 people employed in the municipality. Of these, a total of 203 people worked in 80 businesses in the primary economic sector. The secondary sector employed 996 workers in 145 separate businesses. Finally, the tertiary sector provided 7,654 jobs in 926 businesses. In 2014 a total of 5,211 employees worked in 908 small companies (less than 50 employees). There were 17 mid sized businesses with 2,074 employees and 1 large business which employed 369 people. In 2014 a total of 23.5% of the population received social assistance.

In 2015 local hotels had a total of 797,348 overnight stays, of which 46.9% were international visitors.

Religion
Of the rest of the population, there were 10 individuals (or about 0.09% of the population) who belong to the Christian Catholic faith, 439 individuals (3.85% of the population) who belonged to the Orthodox Church, 274 (2.40%) who belonged to another Christian church, 79 (0.69%) who were Muslim, 56 (0.49%) who belonged to another faith (not listed), and eight residents (0.07%) were Jewish. In addition, 832 residents (7.29%) belonged to no faith, were agnostic or atheist, and 448 individuals (3.92%) did not answer the question.

Sports

Davos's ice hockey team, HC Davos, plays in the National League (NL). Their home arena is the Vaillant Arena. In December of each year, the team and arena host the Spengler Cup, an international tournament first held in 1923.

Bandy is occasionally played there. An international tournament, starting in 2014, has been organised. The 1913 European Bandy Championships in Davos is so far the only one of its kind.

 Parsenn / Gotschna which connects to the partner town of Klosters from Davos Dorf
 Jakobshorn which can be reached from Davos Platz directly
 Pischahorn which can be reached by frequently running buses into Flüela valley
 Rinerhorn to start from Davos Glaris
 Madrisahorn located in neighbouring Klosters
 Schatzalp is privately owned by the Schatzalp Hotel and a specialty as a "decelerated" skiing area

All areas offer summer transport as well on to the main peaks from mid May until end of October. The remote side valleys heading towards the Engadine area are worth long hikes towards the passes of Sertig or Scaletta Pass to reach, for example, Piz Kesch, an Ultra prominent peak. To the north there are no valleys but rather a direct one-day ascent to continue across a pass into the "Schanfigg" valley towards the rival resort of Arosa or even to continue to Lenzerheide in a two-day hike.

Culture

Davos is home to seven sites that are listed as Swiss heritage sites of national significance.

These heritage sites include the Town Archives, the Kirchner Museum, the Grosses Jenatschhaus (a type of charity house known as a Pfrundhaus) and the Forest Cemetery (Waldfriedhof). Several hotels and spas are also included on the list. The three hotels or former hotels are: Berghotel Schatzalp, the former Grand Hotel Belvédère, and the Zürcher Höhenklinik von R. Gaberel.

Davos hosts annual meetings of the World Economic Forum. The city was featured in an episode of Viva La Bam, when cities around Europe were visited. On 14 March 2003, a festival called Winterjam was held in the city and bands such as Sum 41, Crazy Town, and Guano Apes performed during this event.

Transport
Davos is part of the rail network of the Rhaetian Railway (RhB).

The valley station Davos Dorf (Parsennbahn) of the funicular Parsennbahn to Weissfluhjoch (Parsenn) is in Davos Dorf, the station Davos Platz Schatzalpbahn of Schatzalp-Bahn in Davos Platz. Also in Davos Platz are the bottom stations of the cable car to the Jakobshorn, the station Davos Platz DKB (right next to the corresponding railway station), but also the one of the chair lift to Usser Isch, namely the Davos Platz (Talstation Carjöl).

The bottom station of the lift to Rinerhorn is right next to RhB station Davos Glaris. The one (Dörfji) of the Pischa area in the side valley of the Flüela, reachable by bus.

Local buses are operated by Verkehrsbetrieb der Landschaft Davos Gemeinde (vbd).

Research
Davos has several research institutes: the AO Foundation focusing on trauma and disorders of the musculoskeletal system, the Swiss Institute of Allergy and Asthma Research (SIAF), the World Radiation Center (PMOD/WRC) and the Institute for Snow and Avalanche Research (SLF) of the Swiss Federal Institute for Forest, Snow and Landscape Research (WSL).

Notable people

The arts 
 Sophie Taeuber-Arp (1889 in Davos – 1943), painter, sculptor, architect and dancer
 Dorothea Wieck (1908 in Davos – 1986), a German theatre and film actress
 Ernst Haefliger (1919 in Davos – 2007), tenor
 Eberhard W. Kornfeld (born 1923), art collector; made Honorary citizen of Davos in 2004
 Jürg Federspiel (1931–2007), writer, grew up in Davos
 Thomas Hirschhorn (born 1957), artist, grew up in Davos
 Marc Forster (born 1969), German and Swiss director and filmmaker, grew up in Davos made freeman of Davos in 2007

Politics, public service and business 
 Wilhelm Vischer (1895 in Davos – 1988), a pastor, theologian, Hebraist, Old Testament scholar and amateur Lied lyricist
 Ursula Wyss (born 1973 in Davos), economist, Swiss National Councillor 1999–2013 and former Municipal Councilor of Bern

Science, medicine & TB patients 
 Alexander Spengler (1827–1901), a German and Swiss physician, specialised in TB in Davos 
 John Addington Symonds (1840–1893), an English poet and literary critic, TB patient in Davos from 1877.
 Carl Rüedi (1848 in Davos – 1901), a pulmonologist, treated Robert Louis Stevenson
 Robert Louis Stevenson (1850–1894), a Scottish novelist and travel writer, TB patient in Davos in the 1880s.
 Oscar Levertin (1862–1906), a Swedish poet and literary historian; lived in Davos 1888–1890.
 Ernst Ludwig Kirchner (1880–1938 in Davos), German artist, TB patient, lived in Davos from 1917; namesake of the local art museum
 Philipp Bauknecht (1884 – 1933 in Davos), German expressionist painter, TB patient from 1910
 Harry Clarke (1889–1931 in Davos), an Irish stained-glass artist and book illustrator, TB patient from 1929, buried in Chur
 Klabund (1890 – 1928 in Davos), aka Alfred Henschke, German writer and painter, TB patient

Sport 
 Fritz Kraatz (1906–1992), ice hockey player, competed in the 1928 Winter Olympics
 Paul Söllner (1911 in Davos – 1991), German rower, competed in the 1936 Summer Olympics
 Albert Künzler (1911 in Davos – ??), ice hockey player, competed in the 1936 Winter Olympics
 Andreas Däscher (born 1927 in Davos), ski jumper, competed at the 1956 Winter Olympics and developed the Daescher technique
 Franz Berry (1938 in Davos – 2009), ice hockey player, competed in the 1956 and 1964 Summer Olympics
 Peter Frei (born 1946 in Davos), alpine skier, competed in the 1968 Winter Olympics 
 Nicolas Gilliard (born 1947 in Davos), swimmer, competed at the 1968 Summer Olympics
 Paul Accola (born 1967 in Davos), alpine skiing World Cup, overall champion
 Martina Accola (born 1969, Davos), alpine skier, competed in the 1994 and 1998 Winter Olympics
 Andrea Senteler (born 1977), cross-country skier, competed in the 1998 Winter Olympics
 Carmen Schäfer (born 1981 in Davos), a curler
 Andres Ambühl (born 1983 in Davos), ice hockey forward
 Iouri Podladtchikov (born 1988), a Russian-born Swiss snowboarder, brought up in Davos, gold medallist at the 2014 Winter Olympics
 Dino Wieser (born 1989 in Davos), ice hockey forward
 Stefanie Müller (born 1992 in Davos), Alpine snowboarder, competed at the 2014 Winter Olympics
 Claude-Curdin Paschoud (born 1994 in Davos), ice hockey defenceman

See also
 Lake Davos
 List of ski areas and resorts in Switzerland
 Schwarzsee (Davos)
 The Magic Mountain
 World Economic Forum

References

Further reading

External links

  
 Tourism information
 

 
Cities in Switzerland
Municipalities of Graubünden
Ski areas and resorts in Switzerland
Cultural property of national significance in Graubünden